Godliman is a surname. Notable people with the surname include:

Kerry Godliman (born 1973), British comedian and actor
Mandie Godliman (born 1973), British cricketer